Niemi is a Finnish word meaning "peninsula".

People 
It can be used as a surname:
 Antti Niemi (footballer) (born 1972), Finnish football goalkeeper
 Antti Niemi (ice hockey) (born 1983), Finnish ice hockey goaltender
 Antti-Jussi Niemi (born 1977), Finnish ice hockey defenceman
 Erkki Niemi (born 1962), Finnish high jumper
 Esko Niemi (born 1934), Finnish ice hockey player
 Jari Niemi (born 1977), Finnish footballer
 Kai Niemi (born 1955), motorcycle speedway rider
 Laurie Niemi (1925–1968), American footballer
 Lisa Niemi (born 1956), Finnish-American actress and dancer
 Masa Niemi (1914–1960), Finnish actor
 Matti Niemi (rowing) (born 1937), Finnish coxswain
 Matti Niemi (athlete) (born 1976), Finnish hurdler
 Mikael Niemi (born 1959), Swedish author
 Mikko Niemi (basketball) (born 1985), Finnish basketball player
 Mikko Niemi (ice hockey) (born 1972), Finnish ice hockey player
 Pekka Niemi (skier) (1909–1993), Finnish cross-country skier
 Pekka Niemi (weightlifter) (born 1952), Finnish weightlifter
 Pentti Niemi, (1902-1962), Finnish Lutheran clergyman and politician
 Reino Niemi, (1914-1966), Finnish chess player
 Robert Niemi (born 1955), American literary scholar, literary critic and author
 Shane Niemi (born 1978), Canadian sprints athlete
 Veijo Niemi, Finnish politician
 Virpi Niemi (born 1966), Finnish cross country skier

Placenames
It is also used as a placename:
 Niemi, part of Lahti
 , part of Orimattila
 , part of Tampere
 Niemi, village in Halsua
 Niemi, village in Jokioinen
 Niemi, village in Sammatti

Others
, moving company
, engineering company 
, Juha Hurme's book, which was awarded the Finlandia Prize in 2017

Finnish-language surnames